Leontine van der Lienden (born 4 April 1959 in Utrecht) is a Dutch cyclist. She competed in the women's road race at the 1984 Summer Olympics, finishing 28th. She was formerly married to fellow racing cyclist Jean-Paul van Poppel, and is the mother of cyclists Boy van Poppel and Danny van Poppel.

See also
 List of Dutch Olympic cyclists

References

1959 births
Living people
Dutch female cyclists
Olympic cyclists of the Netherlands
Cyclists at the 1984 Summer Olympics
People from Breukelen
Cyclists from Utrecht (province)
20th-century Dutch women
21st-century Dutch women